2016 Spanish regional elections may refer to:

2016 Basque regional election
2016 Galician regional election